Zaynab, la rose d'Aghmat is a 2014 film directed by Farida Bourquia. It was screened at the Festival National du Film in Tangier.

Synopsis 
The film follows Zaynab an-Nafzawiyyah, wife of husband Prince Yusuf ibn Tashfin, founder of the city of Marrakech during the Almoravid era.

Cast 
 Mohamed Majd
 Fatym Layachi
 Amina Rachid
 Abdessalam Bouhssini
 Benissa El Jirari
 Mohamed Khouyi
 Farid Regragui
 Jamila Charik

References

External links 
 

Moroccan drama films
2014 films
Moroccan Arabic
Almoravid dynasty